The Eurociudad Vasca Bayonne-San Sebastián (French: Eurocité basque Bayonne-Saint-Sébastien; Basque: Baiona-Donostia Euskal Eurohiria) is the name given to the urban cross-border region located between Spain and France along the coast of the Cantabrian Sea in the Bay of Biscay.

Given the progressive European integration and the disappearance of internal borders in the European Union, as of 1993 various local institutions on both sides of the border created cross-border cooperation agreements that have led to the creation of a cross-border city project that brings together 42 local entities, both Spanish and French. This project covers the realization of common projects (synergies in the tourism sector, freight transport, use of common infrastructures, etc.). The consortium that directs the  project has the legal entity of a European economic interest group (Groupement européen d'intérêt économique). In the future it could become a eurodistrict.

The project is based on the existence of a real urban region that crosses the border, on the existence of synergies and complementarities between both sides of the border and on the existence of a common Basque cultural base. The three official languages of the institution are Spanish, French and Basque.

Description 
The Basque Eurocity stretches linearly for just over 50 km along the Basque Coast. On the one hand, it encompasses the coastal region of the French department of the Pyrenees-Atlantiques (Côte Basque), between the mouth of the Adur River and the Bidasoa River. It is a relatively flat and traditionally tourism-oriented region, heavily urbanized, but with a relatively low population density, since a large part of the homes are single-family homes, second homes or are tourism-oriented.

On the other side of the Bidasoa river, the Eurocity extends through the Gipuzkoan regions of Bajo Bidasoa, San Sebastián region and part of Urola-Costa, reaching the town of Guetaria at one end. The Spanish part is geographically more rugged than the French, being therefore less urbanized, but it has a different urban typology, with locations with a higher population density and a more industrial character; so it has a larger population.

The two poles of the Eurocity are the city of San Sebastián, on the one hand, and the BAB District (Bayonne-Anglet-Biarritz) on the other. At its central axis are the towns of Fuenterrabía, Irún and Hendaya, which have further deepened cross-border relations with the Bidasoa-Txingudi Consortium.

Localities that comprise it 
The Eurocity has approximately 620,000 inhabitants divided into 42 local entities.

 25 French communes, all of them belonging to the Department of the Pyrenees-Atlantiques and the Basque-French Country (historical province of Labort):

 17 Spanish municipalities, all of them belonging to the Province of Guipúzcoa (Autonomous Community of the Basque Country):

History 
On January 18, 1993, Henri Grenet, president of the Bayona-Anglet-Biarriz District, and Eli Galdos, deputy general of the Guipúzcoa Provincial Council, signed a cross-border cooperation agreement that would be the germ of the Basque Eurocity.

In 1997 the Bayona-San Sebastián cross-border observatory was created by the Provincial Council of Guipúzcoa and the Bayona-Anglet-Biarritz District (converted into the Bayonne-Anglet-Biarritz agglomeration community), under the legal form of an Association European Economic Interest.

In 2001, the Bidasoa-Txingudi Consortium, which brought together the municipalities of Irún, Fuenterrabía and Hendaya, joined the Eurocity.

References

External links 

 Official site
 Basque Eurocity on Google Maps

Gipuzkoa
Pyrénées-Atlantiques